Ernesto Mauro Oglivie (born 11 November 1992) is a professional Panamanian basketball player, who plays for the Titanes de Barranquilla of the Baloncesto Profesional Colombiano.

Professional career
In the 2008–09 season he played for Lechugueros de León.  

He also played for the National Technological University basketball team in Argentina. 

For the 2021 Liga Nacional de Baloncesto Profesional (LNBP) season, he joined Panteras de Aguascalientes. In October 2021, he was one of five finalists for the MVP Award for the Liga Nacional de Baloncesto Profesional West Division. (The other players were Vander Blue, Michael Smith, Lucas Martínez and Karim Rodríguez) At that time, Oglivie had averaged 26:53 minutes, 15.6 points, 4.7 rebounds and 1.6 assists per game. 

In 2021, Oglivie played for Caballos de Coclé in the 2021 BCL Americas season and was the league's leading rebounder with 9.7 per game.

Panama national team
He has been a member of Panama's national basketball team on numerous occasions.

Player profile
According to the Mexican newspaper El Heraldo de Aguascalientes,  Oglivie not only contributes noteworthy stats but also considerable leadership abilities.

References

External links
Ernesto Oglivie at Latinbasket.com
FIBA profile at 2022 FIBA AmeriCup qualification
FIBA profile at 2017 FIBA AmeriCup
Basketball Champions League Americas profile
Ernesto Oglivie at RealGM.com
Ernesto Oglivie at scoutBasketball.com

1989 births
Living people
National Technological University alumni
Panamanian expatriate basketball people in Argentina
Panamanian expatriate basketball people in Mexico
Panamanian expatriate sportspeople in Colombia
Panamanian men's basketball players
Power forwards (basketball)
Sportspeople from Panama City
Abejas de León players
Capitanes de Ciudad de México players
Astros de Jalisco players
Panteras de Aguascalientes players
Titanes de Barranquilla players